The Cruelty to Animals Act 1876 (39 & 40 Vict. c. 77.) was an Act of the Parliament of the United Kingdom which set limits on the practice of, and instituted a licensing system for animal experimentation, amending the Cruelty to Animals Act 1849. It was a public general Act. The Act was replaced 110 years later by the Animals (Scientific Procedures) Act 1986.

The Act

The Act stipulated that researchers would be prosecuted for cruelty, unless they conformed to its provisions, which required that an experiment involving the infliction of pain upon animals to only be conducted when "the proposed experiments are absolutely necessary for the due instruction of the persons [so they may go on to use the instruction] to save or prolong human life".

Furthermore, the Act stated that should the experiment occur, the animal must be anaesthetised, used only once (though several procedures regarded as part of the same experiment were permitted), and killed as soon as the study was over. Prosecutions under the Act could be made only with the approval of the Secretary of State. The Act was applicable to vertebrate animals only.

History and controversy
Opposition to vivisection had led the government to set up a Royal Commission on Vivisection in July 1875, which recommended that legislation be enacted to control it. This Act was created as a result, but was criticized by National Anti-Vivisection Society – itself founded in December 1875 – as "infamous but well-named," in that it made no provision for public accountability of licensing decisions. The law remained in force for 110 years, until it was replaced by the Animals (Scientific Procedures) Act 1986, which is the subject of similar criticism from the modern animal rights movement.

Such was the perceived weakness of the Act, that vivisection opponents chose, on at least one occasion – the Brown Dog affair – to incite a libel suit rather than seek a prosecution under the Act.

Penalties
The Act states, in part:

See also
Wild Animals in Captivity Protection Act 1900
Animal welfare in the United Kingdom

References
Halsbury's Statutes of England. (The Complete Statutes of England). First Edition. Butterworth and Co (Publishers)  Ltd. 1929. Volume 1:   . Page 367. Third Edition. 1968. Volume 2. Page 222. Cumulative Supplement. Part 1. 1985. Paragraph for page 221.
John Mounteney Lely. The Statutes of Practical Utility. (Chitty's Statutes). Fifth Edition. Sweet and Maxwell. Stevens and Sons. London. 1894. Volume 1. Title "Animals". Pages 12 to 17.
Paterson, William. The Practical Statutes of the Session 1876. Pages 245 to 255.
Coleridge, Bernard. Commentary on the Cruelty to Animals Act, 1876. Victoria Street and International Society for the Protection of Animals from Vivisection. Victoria Street London. 1896. Google Books. Reprinted from the Zoophillist as chapter 23 of "The Anti-vivisection Question".
Coleridge, Stephen, "The Administration of the Cruelty to Animals Act of 1876" (1900) 67 Fortnightly Review 392 (No 399, March)
"The First Conviction under the Vivisection Act" (1876) 61 The Law Times 382 (7 October)

External links
Full text of the Act, accessed 12 May 2010.

United Kingdom Acts of Parliament 1876
Repealed United Kingdom Acts of Parliament
Cruelty to animals
Animal welfare and rights legislation in the United Kingdom
Animal testing in the United Kingdom
Anti-vivisection movement